Lufodo Academy of Performing Arts is a Nigerian film academy situated in Ikoyi, Lagos State, Nigeria. It was founded by Joke Silva and Olu Jacobs in 2012.

Background 
Lufodo Academy of Performing Arts was selected as part of Nigerian Cultural Expressions at the 2012 Summer Olympics where they presented 3 full length plays (Wole Soyinka’s The Lion and the Jewel, Fred Agbeyegbe’s The King must dance naked and Sefi Atta’s A Naming Ceremony), a mini film festival as well as a mini poetry festival.

In January 2022, the Lagos State Government handed over the management of Glover Memorial Hall to Lufodo.

Program 
The academy issues a NBTE National Certificate in Acting after students complete their program and casts them in a film or theatre production.

Notable alumni 

 Kaylah Oniwo, Nigerian actress
 Ebinabo Potts-Johnson, Nigerian model and actress

Notable faculty 

 Kemi Akindoju, Nigerian actress - facilitator
 Joke Silva, Nigerian actress - director of studies

References 

Film schools in Nigeria